Ancylosis versicolorella is a species of snout moth in the genus Ancylosis. It was described by Ragonot in 1887, and is known from Turkmenistan and Spain.

The wingspan is about 23 mm.

References

Moths described in 1887
versicolorella
Moths of Europe
Moths of Asia